A. M. Saravanam  was an Indian Congress politician.

Early life 
Born in 1902 to 8th grade in the Nilgiris district of Uttamakandalam, Ooty, India. He was born and raised in the backward community. He was an agro-businessman and died in 1975. His history of struggle actively participating in the Periyakhayam and joined the Indian National Congress Periyakam in 1932. He served in the Congress Party from 1936 to 1956 and continued to serve as Ooty Town Congress, Nilagiri District Congress Secretary and Nilagiri District Congress President.

Freedom activities 
When Subhash Chandra Bose announced the Jai Hind slogan in 1942, the slogan of white Hindus, he named his son Jaihinda at a time when people were scared.  When Tyagi Saravanam visited Mahatma Gandhi's Nilgiris district in 1934, he was proud to organize a meeting with the majority of his people to come to the Kodambakkam. There, the Pillaiyar temple built by his community members was opened. Later, Mahatma Gandhi sat in the same place and took pride in leading the centenary. He was sentenced to several years' imprisonment and a further 6 years in prison. Ooty, Coimbatore, Trichy, Vellore and Madras in the Nilgiris District have spent most of their time in jail. Those in the prison cell were former minister Kakan. Ooty and Nilgiris district was the second capital of the British and was a pioneer in the period of white supremacy. Who also engaged his wife in his freedom struggle.  He was also involved in the Congress bargaining of relatives. Fearing his active involvement, the white supremacists arrested him and landed him in a jungle inhabited by wild animals, 50 miles from Ooty where he escaped, After independence Kamaraj refused to accept the MLC post due to family circumstances. He was later appointed as a member of the Most Aboriginal Welfare Committee.  Kamaraj led Congress is still in the fray when he was approached by Indira Congress as the district leader when the Congress barrage broke during the Indira Gandhi period.  He headed and co-operated the Nilgiris District Laundry Workers Union. Emergency brought to life by Indira Gandhi was shocked after Kamaraj's death and passed away on 7 December 1975.  Prime Minister Indira Gandhi's Copper Sword and Commendation Bond.

References

Indian Tamil people
1975 deaths
1902 births
Activists from Tamil Nadu
Indian National Congress politicians from Tamil Nadu
Indian independence activists from Tamil Nadu